Heliodorus is a genus of flies in the family Tachinidae.

Species
Heliodorus cochisensis Reinhard, 1964
Heliodorus vexillifer Reinhard, 1964

Distribution
United States.

References

Diptera of North America
Exoristinae
Tachinidae genera